The Ivan Rybkin Bloc (Blok Ivana Rybkina) was a political alliance in Russia.

History
The bloc was established by Ivan Rybkin on 21 July 1995. In the December 1995 parliamentary elections it received 1.1% of the proportional representation vote, failing to cross the electoral threshold. However, it won three constituency seats in the State Duma.

The bloc did not contest any further elections.

References

1995 establishments in Russia
Defunct political party alliances in Russia
Political parties established in 1995